Johann Friedrich Franz Burgmüller, generally known as Friedrich Burgmüller (4 December 1806 – 13 February 1874) was a German pianist and composer during the Romantic period. He is perhaps best known for his three collections of children's etudes (or "teaching pieces") for the piano, particularly his Op. 100 "25 Études faciles et progressives" (25 Easy and Progressive Studies) for early intermediate students. The other two collections, for more advanced students, were Op. 105 and 109.

Life
Friedrich Burgmüller was born in Ratisbon (at that time part of the Principality of Regensburg, Confederation of the Rhine). His father Friedrich August Burgmüller and his younger brother Norbert Burgmüller were also composers. His mother was pianist and singer Therese von Zandt.

He moved to Kassel in 1829 to study with Ludwig Spohr and Moritz Hauptmann. There he appeared as a pianist for his first concert, January 14, 1830.

Burgmüller moved to Paris in 1832 (at age 26), where he stayed until his death. Norbert Burgmüller, his brother, made plans to join him in Paris, in 1835. However, he drowned in a spa in Aachen during an epileptic seizure a year later. In Paris, Burgmüller adopted Parisian music and developed his trademark (light) style of playing. He wrote many pieces of salon music for the piano and published several albums. Burgmüller also went on to compose piano études intended for children. He died in Paris on February 13, 1874.

Works
Burgmüller composed piano pieces, waltzes, nocturnes, polonaises and two ballets. His Peasant Pas de Deux was added to Adolphe Adam's ballet Giselle for its 1841 premiere. This music was originally titled Souvenirs de Ratisbonne.

Ballets
 La Péri
 Lady Harriet

With opus numbers
 6 Mélodies gracieuses de Bellini, Op. 26
 Souvenir de Bellini, Op. 27
 Souvenir de Schönbrunn, Op. 32
 La Cachucha, Op. 36
 Murmures du Rhone, Op. 66
 Corbeille de roses, Op. 68
 Fleurs mélodiques, Op. 82
 Fantaisie brillante sur "Ernani" de Verdi, Op. 92
 Blaue Äuglein, Op. 93
 Les Étincelles, Op. 97
 25 Études faciles et progressives, Op. 100
 12 Études, Op. 105
 18 Études, Op. 109

Without opus numbers
 L'Ange consolateur
 Ay Chiquita
 3 Nocturnes, for cello and guitar
 Le Pardon de Ploërmel
 La Péri
 Souvenirs de Londres
 Ballade

References

External links

 
 Free scores Mutopia Project
 Link to Recording of the Opus 100 Etudes at the Piano Society Website 
 Description of the Opus 100 Etudes by Noriaki Nomoto 
 
 

1806 births
1874 deaths
19th-century classical composers
19th-century German composers
19th-century German male musicians
Ballet composers
German male classical composers
German Romantic composers
Male classical pianists
People from Regensburg
People from the Kingdom of Bavaria
Piano pedagogues